Ethiopia competed at the 1983 World Championships in Athletics in Helsinki, Finland, from August 7 to 14, 1983.

Medalists
The following competitors from Ethipia won medals at the Championships

Results

Men 
Track and road events

References

Nations at the 1983 World Championships in Athletics
World Championships in Athletics
1983